Kaptanganj may refer to:

Kaptanganj, India
Kaptanganj, Nepal